The Dr. Oz Show (or simply Oz) is an American syndicated daytime television talk show, hosted by Mehmet Oz, that aired between September 14, 2009, and January 14, 2022. Each episode features segments on health, wellness, and medical information, sometimes including true crime stories and celebrity interviews. It was co-produced by Oprah Winfrey's Harpo Productions/Harpo Studios and OzWorks LLC/Oz Media in association with Sony Pictures Television.

The Dr. Oz Show received nine Daytime Emmy Awards during its run, five for Outstanding Informative Talk Show and four for Outstanding Informative Talk Show Host, as well as criticism for some of its subject matter.

After Oz's November 2021 announcement that he would run as a Republican for the U.S. Senate seat in Pennsylvania, the show ceased production and aired its final episode on Friday, January 14, 2022. A food-themed spin-off talk show, The Good Dish, filled the timeslot on most stations from January 17 through the end of the 2021–22 television season, with its final episode airing May 25, 2022.

Series overview

History

Mehmet Oz appeared on The Oprah Winfrey Show 55 times over five years. In 2009, Winfrey offered to produce a syndicated series featuring Mehmet Oz through her company, Harpo Productions. The Dr. Oz Show debuted September 14, 2009. The first episode discussed the erogenous zones, unnecessary surgeries for women, and germs in purses. In 2010, the show received Daytime Emmy nominations for Outstanding Talk Show Informative and Outstanding Talk Show Informative Host, winning the latter.

For the first four seasons, shows were recorded in Studio 6A at NBC Studios in New York, but vacated Rockefeller Center after NBC reclaimed the space for its Late Night franchise. Beginning with season five, The Dr. Oz Show was recorded in the ABC Television Center East on the Upper West Side of Manhattan. The show later moved to Studio 42 at the CBS Broadcast Center in the Hell's Kitchen neighborhood of Manhattan in 2020.

In April 2018, Sony Pictures Television renewed The Dr. Oz Show for seasons 11 and 12, taking it through 2020–21.

In March 2020, in-studio production was shut down after a staffer experienced "subtle" symptoms and tested positive for COVID-19. Episodes began filming at Oz's home afterward. The show announced that it would return to studio tapings for its season premiere on September 14, 2020, with limited crew members and without a live audience.

In September 2020, The Dr. Oz Show was renewed for a 13th and 14th season, which would have taken the show through 2023.

Ending 
Oz declared his candidacy on November 30, 2021, for the Republican primary for the U.S. Senate seat in Pennsylvania; this forced television stations in Pennsylvania and surrounding states and markets as far west as Cleveland, Ohio and Washington, D.C., to immediately drop the show from their schedule to remain in compliance with the equal-time rule. The show's website was also relocated to drozshow.com, as Oz personally owns the doctoroz.com domain, which was repurposed for his campaign website, along with the show's former logo being adapted for use in that campaign.

On December 13, 2021, Sony Pictures Television (SPT) confirmed that The Dr. Oz Show would air its final episode on Friday, January 14, 2022. The final program, which featured a discussion about shrinkflation and an interview with Maria Shriver, did not directly reference the show's end until the last segment, which was filmed in a different studio, in which Oz confirmed he was stepping aside due to his run for office, but expressed pride in how the series had, in his view, benefited viewers over its thirteen seasons.

The Good Dish 
On Monday, January 17, 2022, most stations that aired Dr. Oz began filling the timeslot with a new SPT-distributed series titled The Good Dish, a food-themed talk show based on Ozs "The Dish" cooking segments, hosted by Mehmet Oz's daughter Daphne Oz, Gail Simmons, and Jamika Pessoa. Sony had originally announced the series in 2019 to air alongside Dr. Oz beginning in the fall of 2020; at the time, the show was set to be hosted by Simmons, Pessoa, Daphne Oz, and Vanessa Williams. Unable to sell it into syndication following the initial announcement, Sony revived the concept as a replacement for Dr. Oz for at least the remainder of the 2021–22 TV season. On March 9, less than two months after its launch, Deadline Hollywood reported The Good Dish would not be renewed in syndication beyond its initial partial season, with SPT exploring other cable or streaming outlets for the program. The Good Dish produced 87 episodes, finishing on May 25, 2022.

Possible revival 
Oz has expressed interest in reviving The Dr. Oz Show after losing Pennsylvania's senate race in November 2022. However, he has been unsuccessful in convincing his former producers to bring it back, citing his highly controversial views after entering politics and a massive ratings drop after Oz announced his run for office.

Reception

According to a 2013 article in The New Yorker, the series was at that time "among the most highly rated daily television programs" in the United States. It consistently scores ratings with daytime television's primary demographic of women from ages 25–54. During the 2016 season, The Dr. Oz Show averaged a 1.4 Nielsen household rating in live-plus-same day numbers. It had a 1.2 Nielsen household rating in 2017 and a 1.1 rating during the 2018 season.

Over the course of its run, The Dr. Oz Show and other similar medical talk shows have been criticized for featuring subject matter that is not supported by published studies. The British Medical Journal found that more than half of the recommendations on these shows contradicted medical research. Producers for the show have stated that the series gives viewers "the most information and the greatest number of tools they can use to make their own choices."

International versions

Awards and nominations

References

Notes

External links
 

2009 American television series debuts
2022 American television series endings
2000s American television talk shows
2010s American television talk shows
2020s American television talk shows
English-language television shows
First-run syndicated television programs in the United States
Television series by Harpo Productions
Health information television series
Oprah Winfrey
Television series by Sony Pictures Television
American television spin-offs
Daytime Emmy Award for Outstanding Talk Show winners
Television shows filmed in New York City
Television Academy Honors winners